John Foran may refer to:
John Foran (sociologist) (born 1955), American sociologist
John Winston Foran (born 1952), Canadian politician
John Foran (rugby league), British rugby league footballer